The Maritime Labour Convention (MLC) is an International Labour Organization (ILO) convention, number 186, established in 2006 as the fourth pillar of international maritime law and embodies "all up-to-date standards of existing international maritime labour Conventions and Recommendations, as well as the fundamental principles to be found in other international labour Conventions". The other pillars are the SOLAS, STCW and MARPOL. The treaties applies to all ships entering the harbours of parties to the treaty (port states), as well as to all ships flying the flag of state party (flag states, as of 2021: over 91 per cent).

Maritime Labour Convention (MLC), according to International Labour Organization, provides a broad perspective to the seafarer’s rights and fortification at work.

The convention entered into force on 20 August 2013, one year after registering 30 ratifications of countries representing over 33 per cent of the world gross tonnage of ships. Already after five ratifications the ratifying countries (Bahamas, Norway, Liberia, Marshall Islands, and Panama) represented over 43 per cent of the gross world tonnage (which is over 33 per cent; the second requirement for entry into force). As of August 2021, the convention has been ratified by 97 states representing over 91 per cent of global shipping.

Although the Convention has not been ratified worldwide, it has widespread effect because vessels from non-signatory states that attempt to enter ports of signatory states may face arrest and penalties for non-compliance with the MLC.

Content and organization
The convention consists of the sixteen articles containing general provisions as well as the Code. The Code consists of five Titles in which specific provisions are grouped by standard (or in Title 5: mode of enforcement):
Title 1: Minimum requirements for seafarers to work on a ship
Title 2: Conditions of employment
Title 3: Accommodation, recreational facilities, food and catering
Title 4: Health protection, medical care, welfare and social security protection
Title 5: Compliance and enforcement
For Each Title, there are general Regulations, which are further specified in mandatory Standards (list A) as well as Guidelines (List B). Guidelines generally form a form of implementation of a Regulation according to the requirements, but States are free to have different implementation measures. Regulations and Standards should in principle be implemented fully, but a country can implement a "substantially equivalent" regulation, which it should declare upon ratification.

Some seafarers criticize the convention, saying that it lacks teeth, does not address real issues, and skirts important seafarer needs such as decent sized cabins, cupboards in cabins, shore leave, and rest hours by including them into Guidelines (List B) of the convention—or worse, by not addressing them at all.

Title 1: Minimum requirements for seafarers to work on a ship
The minimum requirements set out in this section of the code are divided in 4 parts and are summarized below:
Minimum age requirements: the minimum age is 16 years (18 for night work and work in hazardous areas).
Medical fitness: workers should be medically fit for the duties they are performing. Countries should issue medical certificates as defined in the STCW (or use a similar standard).
Training: Seafarers should be trained for their duties as well as have had a personal safety training.
Recruitment/placement services located in member states or for ships flying the flag of member states should have (among others) proper placement procedures, registration, complaint procedures and compensation if the recruitment fails.

Title 2: Employment conditions
The Title on employment conditions lists conditions of the contract and payments, as well as the working conditions on ships. 
Contracts: the contract should be clear, legally enforceable and incorporate collective bargaining agreements (if existent).
Payments: Wages should be paid at least every month, and should be transferable regularly to family if so desired.
Rest hours: rest hours should be implemented in national legislation. The maximum hours of work in that legislation should not exceed 14 hours in any 24-hour period and 72 hours in any seven-day period, or: at least ten hours of rest in any 24-hour period and 77 hours (rest) in any seven-day period. Furthermore, the daily hours of rest may not be divided into more than two periods and, at least six hours of rest should be given consecutively in one of those two periods.
Leave: Seafarers have a right to annual leave as well as shore leave.
Repatriation: Returning to their country of residence should be free.
Loss: If a ship is lost or foundered, the seafarers have a right to an unemployment payments.
Manning: Every ship should have a sufficient manning level.
Development and opportunities: Every seafarer has a right to be promoted during his career except in cases where there is a violation of a statute or code of conduct, which inevitably hinders such promotion. Also, skill development and employment opportunities should be made available for each and every seafarer.

Title 3: Accommodation, recreational facilities, food and catering
The title specifies rules detailed rules for accommodation and recreational facilities, as well as food and catering. 
Accommodation: Accommodation for living and/or working should be "promoting the seafarers' health and well-being". Detailed provisions (in rules and guidelines) give minimum requirements for various types of rooms (mess rooms, recreational rooms, dorms etc.).
Food and catering: Both food quality and quantity, including water should be regulated in the flag state. Furthermore, cooks should have proper training.

Title 4: Health protection, medical care, welfare and social security Protection
Title 4 consists of 5 regulations about health, liability, medical care, welfare and social security. 
Medical care on board ship and ashore: Seafarers should be covered for and have access to medical care while on board; in principle at no cost and of a quality comparable to the standards of health care on shore. Countries through which territory a ship is passing should guarantee treatment on shore in serious cases.
Shipowners' liability: Seafarers should be protected from the financial effects of "sickness, injury or death occurring in connection with their employment". This includes at least 16 weeks of payment of wages after start of sickness.
Health and safety protection and accident prevention: A safe and hygienic environment should be provided to seafarers both during working and resting hours and measures should be taken to take reasonable safety measures.
Access to shore-based welfare facilities: Port states should provide "welfare, cultural, recreational and information facilities and services" and to provide easy access to these services. The access to these facilities should be open to all seafarers irrespective of race, sex, religion or political opinion.
Social security: Social security coverage should be available to seafarers (and in case it is customary in the flag state: their relatives).

Title 5: Compliance and enforcement
Title 5 sets standards to ensure compliance with the convention. The title distinguishes requirements for flag state and port state control. 
Flag states: Flag states (the state under which flag the ship operates) are responsible for ensuring implementation of the rules on the ships that fly its flag. Detailed inspections result in the issue of a "Certificate of Maritime Compliance", which should always be present (and valid) on a ship.  Ships are required to have decent complaints procedures in place for its crew and should institute investigations in case of casualties.
Port states: The inspection in ports depends on whether a Certificate of Maritime Compliance is present (and thus a flag is flown of a country which has ratified the convention). If the Certificate is present, compliance is to be assumed in principle, and further investigations only take place if the certificate is not in order or there are indications of non-compliance. For ships that do not have the certificate, inspections are much more detailed and should ensure, according to a "no more favorable treatment principle", that the ship has complied with the provisions of the convention. The convention is thus indirectly also valid for ships of non-member countries if they plan to call to ports of a member state.
Labour agencies: Agencies supplying on maritime workers to ships should also be inspected to ensure that they apply the convention (among others the regulations regarding to social security).

Negotiations
After tripartite negotiations had started in 2001, the convention was adopted during the 94th International Labour Convention in 2006. The convention received 314 votes in favour and none against by representatives of the government, employers and workers, who each held a single vote per country.

Ratifications

As of April 2022, the treaty has been ratified by 101 countries, many of which are large flag states in terms of the tonnage they transport. The European Union advised its (then) 27 members to ratify the treaty by 31 December 2010. The EU Decision provides: "Member States are hereby authorised to ratify, for the parts falling under Community competence, the Maritime Labour Convention, 2006, of the International Labour Organization, adopted on 7 February 2006. Member States should make efforts to take the necessary steps to deposit their instruments of ratification of the Convention with the Director-General of the International Labour Office as soon as possible, preferably before 31 December 2010." As of January 2021, 23 countries  had done so, while Croatia did so before it entered the European Union. The convention entered into force on 20 August 2013 for the 30 countries that ratified it prior to 20 August 2013. For other countries, the convention enters into force one year after registration of their instrument of ratification. Nearly 1.2 million seafarers are affected by human rights laws, which include regulations on workplace protection, living conditions, employment, health and social security.

Effect on other conventions
The convention changed the status of 37 ILO conventions, which meant that these conventions upon entry into force of this convention closed for ratification (if not already) and that entry into force for a specific country meant automatic denouncement the other conventions (if not already). 

 Minimum Age (Sea) Convention, 1920
 Unemployment Indemnity (Shipwreck) Convention, 1920
 Placing of Seamen Convention, 1920
 Medical Examination of Young Persons (Sea) Convention, 1921
 Seamen's Articles of Agreement Convention, 1926
 Repatriation of Seamen Convention, 1926
 Officers' Competency Certificates Convention, 1936
 Holidays with Pay (Sea) Convention, 1936
 Shipowners' Liability (Sick and Injured Seamen) Convention, 1936
 Sickness Insurance (Sea) Convention, 1936
 Hours of Work and Manning (Sea) Convention, 1936
 Minimum Age (Sea) Convention (Revised), 1936
 Food and Catering (Ships' Crews) Convention, 1946
 Certification of Ships' Cooks Convention, 1946
 Social Security (Seafarers) Convention, 1946
 Paid Vacations (Seafarers) Convention, 1946
 Medical Examination (Seafarers) Convention, 1946
 Certification of Able Seamen Convention, 1946
 Accommodation of Crews Convention, 1946
 Wages, Hours of Work and Manning (Sea) Convention, 1946
 Paid Vacations (Seafarers) Convention (Revised), 1949
 Accommodation of Crews Convention (Revised), 1949
 Wages, Hours of Work and Manning (Sea) Convention (Revised), 1949
 Wages, Hours of Work and Manning (Sea) Convention (Revised), 1958
 Accommodation of Crews (Supplementary Provisions) Convention, 1970
 Prevention of Accidents (Seafarers) Convention, 1970
 Continuity of Employment (Seafarers) Convention, 1976
 Seafarers' Annual Leave with Pay Convention, 1976
 Merchant Shipping (Minimum Standards) Convention, 1976 (and 1996 protocol)
 Seafarers' Welfare Convention, 1987
 Health Protection and Medical Care (Seafarers) Convention, 1987
 Social Security (Seafarers) Convention (Revised), 1987
 Repatriation of Seafarers Convention (Revised), 1987
 Labour Inspection (Seafarers) Convention, 1996
 Recruitment and Placement of Seafarers Convention, 1996
 Seafarers' Hours of Work and the Manning of Ships Convention, 1996

Criticism
While the authors of MLC 2006 called it the fourth pillar of maritime policy, many seafarers themselves and industry bodies saw it as a rather weak convention which did not materially change life at sea. From this perspective, the more important parts of the convention have been placed in the non-mandatory section "B"; other issues, such as air conditioning or interpretations of what could be termed as good nutritious food, are not addressed by the convention. Some seafarers have complained that the convention does not carry any stipulations to make the crew cabins on cargo ships any bigger than they currently are and does not increase the number of cupboards or shelves, which are typically minimal on cargo ships. The convention also does not address the issues of rest hours during work or rest when joining ship; these issues are determined by crew and companies alone.

Maritime labour issues and Coronavirus (COVID-19)
According to the provisions of the 2006 Maritime Labour Convention, the International Labour Organization (ILO) appealed to governments to ensure that seafarers are repatriated and that the risk of COVID-19 virus infection is minimised.

The ILO memorandum aimed to create synergies between the action strategies of the International Maritime Organization (IMO) and the World Health Organization (WHO) to prevent the spread of COVID-19. Both the International Chamber of Shipping and the International Transport Workers' Federation has been active in supporting seafarers and ship-owners and advise on their membership. The International Chamber of Shipping published the 'Coronavirus (COVID-19) Guidance for Ship Operators for the Protection of the Health of Seafarers' and the International Transport Workers' Federation published the information material 'COVID-19 advice to ships and seafarers.'

After the initial 'force majeure' caused by sudden and indiscriminate border closures, crew change remained a significant issue throughout the pandemic. Christiaan De Beukelaer argues in the journal Marine Policy that the continued crew change crisis risks eroding the Maritime Labour Convention.

References

External links 
ILO Convention site
Treaty text and Ratifications (ILO)

International Labour Organization conventions
Treaties concluded in 2006
Treaties entered into force in 2013
Admiralty law treaties
Treaties of Albania
Treaties of Algeria
Treaties of Antigua and Barbuda
Treaties of Argentina
Treaties of Australia
Treaties of the Bahamas
Treaties of Bangladesh
Treaties of Barbados
Treaties of Belgium
Treaties of Belize
Treaties of Benin
Treaties of Bosnia and Herzegovina
Treaties of Brazil
Treaties of Bulgaria
Treaties of Canada
Treaties of Cape Verde
Treaties of China
Treaties of Chile
Treaties of the Republic of the Congo
Treaties of the Cook Islands
Treaties of Croatia
Treaties of Cyprus
Treaties of Denmark
Treaties of Djibouti
Treaties of Ethiopia
Treaties of Fiji
Treaties of Finland
Treaties of France
Treaties of Gabon
Treaties of Germany
Treaties of the Gambia
Treaties of Ghana
Treaties of Greece
Treaties of Grenada
Treaties of Hungary
Treaties of Iceland
Treaties of India
Treaties of Indonesia
Treaties of Iran
Treaties of Ireland
Treaties of Italy
Treaties of Jamaica
Treaties of Japan
Treaties of Jordan
Treaties of Kenya
Treaties of South Korea
Treaties of Kiribati
Treaties of Latvia
Treaties of Lithuania
Treaties of Lebanon
Treaties of Liberia
Treaties of Luxembourg
Treaties of Malaysia
Treaties of the Maldives
Treaties of Malta
Treaties of the Marshall Islands
Treaties of Mauritius
Treaties of Mongolia
Treaties of Montenegro
Treaties of Morocco
Treaties of Mozambique
Treaties of Myanmar
Treaties of New Zealand
Treaties of the Netherlands
Treaties of Nicaragua
Treaties of Nigeria
Treaties of Norway
Treaties of Palau
Treaties of Panama
Treaties of the Philippines
Treaties of Poland
Treaties of Romania
Treaties of Russia
Treaties of Saint Kitts and Nevis
Treaties of Saint Vincent and the Grenadines
Treaties of Samoa
Treaties of Senegal
Treaties of Serbia
Treaties of Seychelles
Treaties of Singapore
Treaties of Slovakia
Treaties of Slovenia
Treaties of South Africa
Treaties of Spain
Treaties of Sri Lanka
Treaties of Sudan
Treaties of Sweden
Treaties of Switzerland
Treaties of Tanzania
Treaties of Thailand
Treaties of Togo
Treaties of Tunisia
Treaties of Tuvalu
Treaties of the United Kingdom
Treaties of Vietnam
Treaties extended to the Isle of Man
Treaties extended to Gibraltar
Treaties extended to the Faroe Islands
Treaties extended to New Caledonia
Treaties extended to the Cayman Islands
Treaties extended to Bermuda
Treaties extended to the Falkland Islands
Treaties extended to the British Virgin Islands
Treaties extended to Hong Kong
Treaties extended to Curaçao
2006 in labor relations